Martians Come Back! is an album by American jazz trumpeter, composer and arranger Shorty Rogers, released on the Atlantic label in August 1956.

Reception

Jim Todd, writing for Allmusic, described the album as "a good overview of Rogers' work in the company of a who's who of West Coast jazz, playing arrangements for trumpet section and rhythm, quintet, and brass and winds with rhythm."

Track listing 
All compositions by Shorty Rogers except where noted.
 "Martians Come Back" - 6:13 	
 "Astral Alley" - 4:35
 "Lotus Bud" - 4:56
 "Dickie's Dream" (Count Basie, Lester Young) - 5:33
 "Papouche" - 4:16
 "Serenade in Sweets" - 6:35
 "Planetarium" - 3:37
 "Chant of the Cosmos" - 6:15 
Recorded in Los Angeles, CA on October 26 (tracks 1 & 7), November 3 (tracks 3 & 5), December 6 (tracks 2 & 6), December 9 (track 8) and December 16 (track 4), 1955

Personnel 
Shorty Rogers - trumpet, flugelhorn
Conte Candoli, Pete Candoli, Harry Edison, Don Fagerquist - trumpet (tracks 2 & 6)
Bob Enevoldsen - valve trombone (track 8)
John Graas - French horn (track 8)
Paul Sarmento - tuba (track 8) 
Jimmy Giuffre - clarinet (tracks 1, 3, 5, 7 & 8)
Bud Shank - alto saxophone (tracks 4 & 8)
Barney Kessel - guitar (track 4)
Pete Jolly (track 4), Lou Levy (tracks 1-3 & 5-8) - piano
Ralph Peña (tracks 1-3 & 5-8), Leroy Vinnegar (track 4) - bass 
Shelly Manne - drums

References 

Shorty Rogers albums
1956 albums
Atlantic Records albums
Albums produced by Nesuhi Ertegun